The Filobasidiaceae are a family of fungi in the order Filobasidiales. Most species are yeasts, but some form gelatinous fruit bodies that are parasitic on other fungi, including lichens. The family currently contains five genera.

References

Tremellomycetes
Filobasidiaceae